Carl Limberger (born 24 January 1964) is a former professional tennis player from Australia. 

Limberger won one doubles title and reached eight doubles finals when on the ATP Circuit. His highest singles ranking was World Number 71 on 11 May 1987. His highest doubles ranking was World Number 53 on 6 July 1987. The right-hander resides in Sydney.

Career finals

Doubles: 8 (1 win – 7 losses)

External links
 
 

Australian male tennis players
Sportspeople from Wagga Wagga
Tennis players from Sydney
Australian people of German descent
1964 births
Living people